Bradley Kevin Ally (born December 11, 1986) is a three-time Olympic swimmer from Barbados.  He represented Barbados at the 2004, 2008 and 2012 Summer Olympics.  He was the bronze medalist in the 200-meter individual medley at the Pan-American Games in Brazil 2007.  He holds the Barbadian Record in the butterfly and individual medley events, as well as the 200-meter freestyle.

Ally was born in Barbados in 1986.

Ally received an athletic scholarship to attend the University of Florida in Gainesville, Florida, where he swam for coach Gregg Troy's Florida Gators swimming and diving team in National Collegiate Athletic Association (NCAA) competition from 2007 to 2010.  Ally set an NCAA record in the 200-yard individual medley with a time of 1.40.49.  He graduated from the University of Florida with a bachelor's degree in geology in 2010.

At the 2006 Central American and Caribbean Games, he bettered the Games records in the 200 and 400-metre individual medley (2:02.98 and 4:22.86).

Ally now coaches swimming near his home outside of Fort Lauderdale.

See also 

 Florida Gators
 List of University of Florida alumni
 List of University of Florida Olympians

References

External links 
 Ally's bio from the 2008 Olympics website.
 Ally's bio from the University of Florida Athletics website.

1986 births
Living people
Florida Gators men's swimmers
Olympic swimmers of Barbados
Male backstroke swimmers
Male breaststroke swimmers
Male butterfly swimmers
Barbadian male freestyle swimmers
Male medley swimmers
Swimmers at the 2003 Pan American Games
Swimmers at the 2004 Summer Olympics
Swimmers at the 2006 Commonwealth Games
Swimmers at the 2007 Pan American Games
Swimmers at the 2008 Summer Olympics
Swimmers at the 2012 Summer Olympics
Commonwealth Games competitors for Barbados
Pan American Games bronze medalists for Barbados
Pan American Games medalists in swimming
Competitors at the 2006 Central American and Caribbean Games
Competitors at the 2010 Central American and Caribbean Games
Central American and Caribbean Games gold medalists for Barbados
Central American and Caribbean Games silver medalists for Barbados
Central American and Caribbean Games medalists in swimming
Medalists at the 2007 Pan American Games